Francisco Demetrio Sánchez Betancourt (born September 6, 1976) is a former butterfly and freestyle swimmer from Venezuela, who won the 50 meter freestyle at the 1995 FINA Short Course World Championships (25 meter pool) in Rio de Janeiro. Two years later, at the third edition of the event, he won the 50 meter and the 100 meter freestyle.

He swam collegiately for the USA's Arizona State University in the late 1990s.

At the 1998 Central American and Caribbean Games, he set a Championship Record in the 100 fly (53.86). This record stood until the 2006 Games where it was bettered by fellow Venezuelan Albert Subirats.

References

1976 births
Living people
People from Cumaná
Venezuelan male swimmers
Male butterfly swimmers
Venezuelan male freestyle swimmers
Arizona State Sun Devils men's swimmers
Olympic swimmers of Venezuela
Swimmers at the 1995 Pan American Games
Swimmers at the 1996 Summer Olympics
Swimmers at the 1999 Pan American Games
Swimmers at the 2000 Summer Olympics
Medalists at the FINA World Swimming Championships (25 m)
Pan American Games gold medalists for Venezuela
Pan American Games bronze medalists for Venezuela
Pan American Games medalists in swimming
Goodwill Games medalists in swimming
Central American and Caribbean Games gold medalists for Venezuela
Competitors at the 1993 Central American and Caribbean Games
Competitors at the 1998 Central American and Caribbean Games
Competitors at the 2002 Central American and Caribbean Games
Central American and Caribbean Games medalists in swimming
Competitors at the 1998 Goodwill Games
Medalists at the 1995 Pan American Games
Medalists at the 1999 Pan American Games
20th-century Venezuelan people
21st-century Venezuelan people